The Pioneer League is an independent baseball league in the United States. From 1939 to 2020, it was part of affiliated Minor League Baseball. A league champion is determined at the end of each season. Champions have been determined by postseason playoffs or winning the regular season pennant. Currently, the first- and second-half winners within each division, North and South, meet in a best-of-three series to determine division champions. Then, the North and South division winners play a best-of-three series to determine a league champion.

League champions
Series and finalist information is only presented when postseason play occurred; the lack of this information indicates a declared league champion.

Championship wins by team
Active Pioneer League teams appear in bold.

References

C
Pioneer
Pioneer League champions
Pioneer League